The Basilica of Our Lady, Queen of Ireland, at Knock is a Roman Catholic Church of the Latin Rite located in the small town of Knock, in County Mayo in the West Region of Ireland. It was designed in modern architecture style with concrete materials by architect Daithi Hanly, and completed in 1976. The basilica, which can accommodate approximately 10,000 people, serves the Roman Catholic Archdiocese of Tuam, and it is part of the Knock Shrine grounds that incorporates four other churches, including the Apparition Church, the place where, according to Catholic beliefs, on Thursday evening of 21 August 1879, the Blessed Virgin Mary, Saint Joseph, and Saint John the Evangelist are proposed to have appeared, the old Parish church, the Blessed Sacrament Chapel, and the Chapel of Reconciliation. In this Ireland's National Marian shrine there are also a religious books' centre, a caravan and camping park, the Knock House Hotel, and the Knock Museum.

References

External links

Roman Catholic churches in County Mayo
20th-century Roman Catholic church buildings in Ireland
Roman Catholic churches completed in 1976
20th-century churches in the Republic of Ireland